Marco Schleef (born 15 January 1999) is a German footballer who plays as a centre-back for TSV Havelse.

Career
Schleef made his professional debut for TSV Havelse in the 3. Liga on 5 February 2022 against SV Meppen, coming on as a substitute for Leon Damer in the 87th minute.

References

External links
 
 
 
 

1999 births
Living people
German footballers
Association football defenders
Eintracht Braunschweig II players
TSV Havelse players
3. Liga players
Regionalliga players